Timothy Richard Heidecker (born February 3, 1976) is an American comedian, writer, director, actor, and musician. Along with Eric Wareheim, he is a member of the comedy duo Tim & Eric. 

He has also appeared in films, including Bridesmaids (2011), Tim and Eric's Billion Dollar Movie (2012), The Comedy (2012), Ant-Man and the Wasp (2018), and Us (2019). He currently co-hosts the parodic film review web series On Cinema and stars in the comedy series Decker alongside Gregg Turkington and hosts a weekly call-in show, Office Hours Live with Tim Heidecker, with DJ Douggpound and Vic Berger.

Early life
Timothy Richard Heidecker was born in Allentown, Pennsylvania on February 3, 1976. He attended and graduated from Allentown Central Catholic High School in Allentown, and then attended Temple University in Philadelphia, where he met his comedy partner Eric Wareheim.

Career

Television
Heidecker and Wareheim created, wrote, and starred in Tom Goes to the Mayor, a limited animation series that aired from November 2004 to September 2006 on Adult Swim. Heidecker plays Tom, the protagonist of the show who continually brings his ideas to the Mayor (played by Wareheim) only to have them thwarted in most cases, leaving Tom worse off than when he started. According to their website, Wareheim and Heidecker had mailed copies of an early version of the show to comedian Bob Odenkirk, who agreed to take on the project as the executive producer of the series and sold it to Adult Swim.

The duo's second show, Tim and Eric Awesome Show, Great Job!, premiered in 2007, on Adult Swim. They also created and starred in Tim and Eric's Billion Dollar Movie, and appeared together as debt collectors on the Adult Swim special Young Person's Guide to History and have made guest appearances in the movie Let's Go to Prison, as well as the Scottish video game series VideoGaiden and a Version 2 episode of Mega64. Heidecker also had a small role in the 2011 film Bridesmaids, and a leading role in the 2012 independent drama The Comedy, directed by Rick Alverson and also starring Wareheim. In July 2012, Heidecker starred in an episode of Workaholics. In 2012, he guest starred in Dinosaur Jr.'s music video "Watch the Corners." In the same year, Heidecker made a cameo appearance on the independent movie reviewing site, Red Letter Media. Heidecker appeared in an episode of the RedLetterMedia series, "Half in The Bag." The episode is titled "Season Finale: Step Up Revolution." Within the short sketch comedy, Heidecker plays a VCR repairman named "Tim". Shortly after his introduction into the scene, he flies through the ceiling and makes his exit from the skit.

Heidecker starred in a series of films for Absolut Vodka's website with Wareheim and Zach Galifianakis. In 2010, Heidecker and Wareheim directed a series of Old Spice commercials starring actor Terry Crews. Using characters and skits from Awesome Show, Heidecker and Wareheim (via their Abso Lutely Productions company) created an online-only show called "Tim and Eric Nite Live!," originally broadcast on the website SuperDeluxe.

Since 2012, Heidecker has hosted a parodic web series and podcast called On Cinema, where he and special guest (Gregg Turkington) discuss films from past and present. In 2013 an On Cinema Film Guide app was released, featuring the voices of Heidecker and Turkington reviewing over 17,000 films. Heidecker, Wareheim, Sarah Silverman, Michael Cera, and Reggie Watts announced on the podcast Comedy Bang! Bang! that they were starting a comedy YouTube channel called Jash.

Since 2016, Heidecker has hosted the podcast and web series Office Hours Live along with Vic Berger and Doug Lussenhop. It features phone and video calls with fans, comedians, musicians, and political commentators.

The duo's anthology horror series, Tim and Eric's Bedtime Stories, aired on Adult Swim from 2014 to 2017. A sitcom starring the duo, Beef House, premiered in March 2020.

On October 23, 2020, Heidecker released his first stand-up comedy special, An Evening With Tim Heidecker, on YouTube. Filmed in the style of a typical standup special, Heidecker's special is a "parody" of the format in which he deliberately plays a hack stand-up comic.

Music

Heidecker played in various indie rock bands while in Philadelphia. He made an appearance in the 2008 Ben Folds and Regina Spektor music video entitled "You Don't Know Me".

Although Davin Wood composed the music for Awesome Show, Heidecker would sometimes sing and write lyrics. Williams Street Records released both Awesome Record, Great Songs! and Uncle Muscles Presents Casey And His Brother in 2008, featuring music from the first two seasons. Wood previously composed the music for Tom Goes To The Mayor, and he and Heidecker form the duo Heidecker & Wood. Inspired by 1970s soft rock, they released their first album, Starting From Nowhere, on March 15, 2011. The duo released a second album in the same style on November 12, 2013, Some Things Never Stay the Same. They cite the influence of Randy Newman, Warren Zevon, Harry Nilsson, and Boz Scaggs.

In 2012, Heidecker contributed a parody campaign jingle for Herman Cain's presidential bid titled "Cain Train". This was the first of nine songs which would eventually become a full album, titled Cainthology: Songs in the Key of Cain. All of the proceeds from the album's sales go to benefit the Violence Intervention Program. The number nine was chosen as the number of songs, and $9.99 the original price, in reference to Herman Cain's 9-9-9 financial plan.

Before the release of Bob Dylan's album Tempest in September 2012, Heidecker released a Dylan pastiche called "Titanic", spoofing the news that the album would feature a 14-minute track about the RMS Titanic. In 2013, he released two more Dylan parodies—"Running Out the Clock", inspired by Dylan's 1983 album Infidels, and "Long Black Dress", a song in the actual style of Dylan's album Tempest—and collaborated with the indie band The Earth is a Man on a cover of Dylan's "All the Tired Horses."

In 2013, Heidecker released the album Urinal St. Station under the Drag City label with his band, The Yellow River Boys. The lead single, "Hot Piss," was released in June 2013. Vice Magazine named Urinal St. Station as the best album of 2013.

Heidecker and Davin Wood composed and performed the song "Weatherman" which was used in the 2014 film The Age of Reason.

In June 2014, Heidecker and Wareheim released a 12″ single, "Jambalaya", as Pusswhip Banggang.

Heidecker's solo album In Glendale was released in May 20, 2016, on Rado Records.

He released Too Dumb for Suicide: Tim Heidecker's Trump Songs via Jagjaguwar on November 8, 2017, a year to the date since Trump's presidential victory.

In August 2020, Heidecker announced Fear of Death, a concept album featuring members of Foxygen, The Lemon Twigs, and Weyes Blood, slated for release on September25 from Spacebomb Records.

Heidecker's sixth album, High School, was released June 24, 2022, on Spacebomb Records  followed by a supporting North American tour.

Personal life
Heidecker is married to actress Marilyn Porayko. They have a daughter named Amelia (born November 2013) and a son named Charlie (born October 2016).

Heidecker joined the Democratic Socialists of America in June 2018. He has described himself as both an atheist and an agnostic.

Filmography

Film

Television

Web series

Podcasts

Applications

Discography

Solo
Studio albums
 2011: Cainthology: Songs in the Key of Cain
 2016: In Glendale
 2017: Too Dumb for Suicide
 2019: What the Brokenhearted Do...
 2020: Fear of Death
 2022: High School

Compilation albums
2018: Another Year In Hell: Collected Songs from 2018

The Tim Heidecker Masterpiece
 2000: Working Vacation (EP)
 2002: Theatre of Magic (rock opera)

Tim & Eric
 2008: Awesome Record, Great Songs! Volume One
 2008: Uncle Muscles Presents Casey And His Brother (as Casey And His Brother)
 2014: "Jambalaya" (12" single, as Pusswhip Banggang)

Heidecker & Wood
 2011: Starting From Nowhere
 2013: Some Things Never Stay the Same

The Yellow River Boys
 2013: Urinal St. Station
 2021: Greatest Hits

Bibliography
 (2010) Bicycle Built for Two (with Gregg Turkington)
 (2015) Tim and Eric's Zone Theory (with Eric Wareheim)
 (2019) Brendan Kearney's Official On Cinema at the Cinema Reader Volume 1 : 2010–2018 (with Gregg Turkington and Brendan Kearney)

Stand-up special 

 2020: An Evening with Tim Heidecker

Awards and honors
Webby Award for best actor as part of the comedy team of Tim and Eric

References

External links

 
 
 
 

1976 births
Living people
21st-century American male actors
Allentown Central Catholic High School alumni
American agnostics
American atheists
American sketch comedians
American male comedians
American comedy musicians
American music video directors
American male television actors
American male web series actors
American television directors
American television writers
American male television writers
California socialists
Comedians from Pennsylvania
Male actors from Allentown, Pennsylvania
Members of the Democratic Socialists of America
Pennsylvania socialists
Screenwriters from Pennsylvania
Showrunners
Spacebomb Records artists
Temple University alumni
Tim & Eric
Writers from Allentown, Pennsylvania